I31 or I-31 may refer to:

 Interstate 31, initially proposed as the name for Interstate 29 between Fargo, North Dakota and the Canada–US border
 Japanese submarine I-31, a Type B1 submarine operated during World War II